Arrive may refer to:

Arrive (company), a Norwegian transport information company
Arrivé, a residential high-rise building in Seattle, United States
Saint-Gladie-Arrive-Munein, a French commune

See also
Arriving (disambiguation)
Arrival (disambiguation)